Cramont is a commune in the Somme department in Hauts-de-France in northern France.

Geography

History
In 1524, the troops of Charles Quint, Holy Roman Emperor and king of Spain reduced the town and much of the surrounding area to ashes.

In 1867, the population stood at 615, in 162 houses. The chief occupations were centred on the linen industry.

Places of interest
 St. Martin's church built in 1857 by Oswald Macqueron, is built of stone and covered in slates.

Population
The inhabitants of the town of Cramont are referred to as Cramontois, Cramontoises in French.

See also
 Communes of the Somme department

References

Communes of Somme (department)